Heinz Tetzner (8 March 1920 – 20 August 2007) was a German expressionist painter and printmaker. Tetzner was born in Gersdorf (Saxony). He died in Gersdorf 2007.

1920 births
2007 deaths
People from Zwickau (district)
German Expressionist painters
20th-century German painters
20th-century German male artists
German male painters
21st-century German painters
21st-century German male artists
Officers Crosses of the Order of Merit of the Federal Republic of Germany
20th-century German printmakers